Kwame Watson-Siriboe (born November 13, 1986), is an American retired soccer player.

Career

College and Amateur
Watson-Siriboe attended Canyon High School and played club soccer with the Pateadores Soccer Club before playing college soccer at the University of Connecticut. Watson-Siriboe appeared in over 60 games for the Huskies, scoring three goals as a senior in 2009. He was awarded the Eric S. Lund Award for the team's most improved player in 2007, and was named the 2009 Big East Co-Defender of the Year.

During his college years he also played one game for the Westchester Flames in the USL Premier Development League.

Professional
Watson-Siriboe was drafted in the second round (26th overall) of the 2010 MLS SuperDraft by Chicago Fire. He made his professional debut on April 3, 2010, in a game against Colorado Rapids.

On June 3, 2011, Watson-Siriboe was loaned to FC Tampa Bay in the North American Soccer League for the remainder of the 2011 season. He made his debut for Tampa on June 4, in a 2–1 loss to the Carolina RailHawks. Watson-Siriboe returned to Chicago at the conclusion of the 2011 NASL season.

Watson-Siriboe was traded to Real Salt Lake on June 27, 2012, in exchange for a fourth-round 2014 MLS SuperDraft pick.

On August 11, 2014, Watson-Siriboe was traded to New York City FC in exchange for a fourth-round 2016 MLS SuperDraft pick.

After his release from New York City FC, Watson-Siriboe was placed in the 2015 MLS Re-Entry Draft.

On August 6, 2016, Watson-Siriboe signed with United Soccer League side Orange County Blues.

On February 3, 2017, Watson-Siriboe signed for North American Soccer League side Indy Eleven.

In April 2018,Watson-Siriboe joined KTP in Ykkönen.

International
Watson-Siriboe was a member of the United States' U18 national team that traveled to Argentina in 2004.

References

External links
 

1986 births
Living people
African-American soccer players
American soccer players
American sportspeople of Ghanaian descent
UConn Huskies men's soccer players
Westchester Flames players
Chicago Fire FC players
Tampa Bay Rowdies players
Real Salt Lake players
Orange County SC players
New York City FC players
North Carolina FC players
Indy Eleven players
Soccer players from California
Chicago Fire FC draft picks
USL League Two players
Major League Soccer players
North American Soccer League players
USL Championship players
Kotkan Työväen Palloilijat players
Association football defenders
American expatriate soccer players
Expatriate footballers in Finland
American expatriate sportspeople in Finland
21st-century African-American sportspeople
20th-century African-American people